Eusepi is an Italian surname. Notable people with the surname include:

 Cecilia Eusepi (1910–1928), Italian Roman Catholic diarist
  (born 1956), Italian footballer
 Umberto Eusepi (born 1989), Italian footballer

Italian-language surnames